Heinrich Büllwatsch (born 1 January 1935) is an Austrian footballer. He played in two matches for the Austria national football team from 1958 to 1959.

References

External links
 
 

1935 births
Living people
Austrian footballers
Austria international footballers
Place of birth missing (living people)
Association football defenders
Wiener Sport-Club players
FC Kärnten players